"Love Goes Down" is the fifth single from British songwriter and rapper Plan B's second studio album, The Defamation of Strickland Banks. The single was released on 2010. HiveMag said of the song: "It’s delightfully soulful and gentle, especially in contrast with some of Plan B’s earlier records. It’s a nice wind-down song. It’s peaceful; it’s relaxing and perfect for this time of year. Yes it may be different and maybe we shouldn’t like it, but the vintage sounding, Motown-like track just seems to work. It’s different but I admire artists that experiment with their sound and adapt to new sounds."

Music video
The music video for "Love Goes Down" was directed by Daniel Wolfe. It features Strickland Banks performing the song on a television programme. The video also uses clips of Banks' day-to-day life and ends with the television programme cutting the song before it finishes, leaving Banks furious as he knocks the microphone stand to the floor and walks off and is arrested by the police.

Track listing
 UK CD single
 "Love Goes Down" - 3:51

 UK Promotional CD single
 "Love Goes Down" (Doctor P Remix) – 5:08
 "Love Goes Down" (Doctor P Dub) – 5:08
 "Love Goes Down" (Doctor P Remix Edit) – 3:47
 "Love Goes Down" (Danny Byrd Remix) – 4:42
 "Love Goes Down" (Danny Byrd Instrumental) – 4:42
 "Love Goes Down" (Danny Byrd Remix Edit) – 3:09

 Digital download - Remix
 "Love Goes Down" (Doctor P Remix) – 5:08

 Digital download - Remix
 "Love Goes Down" (Danny Byrd Remix) – 4:42

Personnel

 Plan B – vocals, producer

Production
 David McEwan – producer
 Eric Appapoulay – additional producer
 Mark "Top" Rankin – engineer, mixing
 Harry Escott – string arrangements
 Sally Herbert – string arrangements
 Jason Yarde – brass arrangements

Charts

Certifications

References

External links
 
 

2010 singles
679 Artists singles
Atlantic Records UK singles
British soul songs
Plan B (musician) songs
Songs written by Plan B (musician)
2009 songs